The 'Honey Gold' mango is a named mango cultivar that is grown in Australia and known for its sweet flavor and fiberless flesh.

History 
Honey Gold was first produced in Queensland's Rockhampton region in 1991 as hybrid between Kensington Pride and an unknown variety. The Queensland-based Piñata Farms owns the rights to Honey Gold.

Description 
The fruit has a yellow-orange skin and an intense, punchy, distinctive sweet flavor.

See also 
List of mango cultivars

References 

1991 establishments in Australia
Mango cultivars